Kyösti Luukko (February 17, 1903 – October 27, 1970) was a Finnish wrestler and Olympic medalist. He won the silver medal in freestyle wrestling at the 1932 Summer Olympics in Los Angeles. He also competed at the 1936 Summer Olympics.

References

External links
 

1903 births
1970 deaths
Olympic wrestlers of Finland
Wrestlers at the 1932 Summer Olympics
Wrestlers at the 1936 Summer Olympics
Finnish male sport wrestlers
Olympic silver medalists for Finland
Olympic medalists in wrestling
Medalists at the 1932 Summer Olympics
20th-century Finnish people